Wirsing is a German language nickname surname and may refer to:
Eduard Wirsing (1931–2022), German mathematician
Giselher Wirsing (1907–1975), German journalist
Hans-Peter Wirsing (1938–2009), German painter
Martin Wirsing (born 1948), German computer scientist
Toni Wirsing (born 1990), German motorcycle racer
Werner Wirsing (1919–2017), German architect

See also 
 Josef Wirsching (1903–1967), German cinematographer

References 

German-language surnames
Surnames from nicknames